Reid D. Milanovich (born 1982 or 1983) is a Cahuilla politician. Since April 2022, he has served as the Chairman of the Agua Caliente Band of Cahuilla Indians in Riverside County, California He has served five terms on the tribal council.

Early life and education

Reid D. Milanovich was born in the early 1980s. His father is Richard Milanovich, who served as Agua Caliente Band of Cahuilla Indians Chairman for 28 years. His mother is Melissa Milanovich. Reid Milanovich has five siblings: one sister and four brothers. His grandmother was LaVerne Saubel, who served on the  council for the tribe and co-authored the tribe's constitution.

Milanovich earned his bachelor's degree from California Baptist University in political science.

Career

Milanovich never had interest in politics, despite his father's involvement, until he returned to Palm Springs after college in 2011. He started attending Agua Caliente Band of Cahuilla Indians tribal meetings. He joined the tribe's scholarship commission and from 2012 through 2014 served as a board member of the Agua Caliente Cultural Museum board of directors.

He ran for election on the tribal council unsuccessfully in 2013. He eventually served as a proxy for the tribal council. He was elected to the tribal council in April 2014. In November 2019, he became Vice Chairman of the Agua Caliente Band of Cahuilla Indians in the wake of a special election after the July 2019 death of then vice chairman Larry N. Olinger. Milanovich spoke at the funeral of Olinger. On April 5, 2022, Milanovich was sworn in as Chairman of the Agua Caliente Band of Cahuilla Indians.

Personal life

He lives in Palm Springs, California.

References

1980s births
Living people
Cahuilla people
Chairpersons of the Agua Caliente Band of Cahuilla Indians
21st-century Native American politicians
American people of Serbian descent
American people of Swedish descent
People from Palm Springs, California
Native American men in politics
California Baptist University alumni